Lindsay Lindley (born 10 June 1989) is an American-born Nigerian sprinter who specializes in the 100m hurdles. She represented Nigeria at the 2015 World Championships in Athletics after she was selected by the Athletics Federation of Nigeria. In 2015, she claimed bronze in the 100 metres hurdles event at the 2015 All-Africa Games.

Competition record

References

External links
 
 Profile on All Athletics

Living people
1989 births
Sportspeople from Manhattan
American sportspeople of Nigerian descent
Nigerian female hurdlers
American female hurdlers
African-American female track and field athletes
World Athletics Championships athletes for Nigeria
Athletes (track and field) at the 2015 African Games
African Games bronze medalists for Nigeria
African Games medalists in athletics (track and field)
Track and field athletes from New York City
21st-century African-American sportspeople
21st-century African-American women
20th-century African-American people
20th-century African-American women